The 56th edition of the Men's World Allround Speed Skating Championships was held on 11 and 12 February 1995 at the Ice Rink Piné, Baselga di Pinè in Italy.

The field consisted of 35 speed skaters from 19 countries. It was the final edition held separately for men. From 1996 onward the men's and women's World Allround Speed Skating Championships would be combined into a single tournament.

Rintje Ritsma won the world title ahead of Keiji Shirahata and Roberto Sighel. It was his first world title. From 1996 onward, the men's and women's World Allround Speed Skating Championships took place on the same days and at the same venue.

Distance medals

Standings 

 * = Fell

Source:

See also
1995 Women's World Allround Speed Skating Championships

References

External links
Results on SpeedSkatingNews

1995 World Allround
World Allround Speed Skating Championships
Men's World Allround. 1995